Al-Ahli Sarba BC is a Lebanese basketball club based in Jounieh.  The basketball program was established in 2010, as part of the historic Ahli Sarba football club established in 1948. The basketball club was promoted to the fourth division of the Lebanese basketball league in the 2015–16 campaign. They currently play in the Lebanese Basketball Fourth Division.

See also 
Ahli Sarba
Ahli Sarba FC

Basketball teams in Lebanon
Basketball teams established in 2010
2010 establishments in Lebanon
Keserwan District